Suhl – Schmalkalden-Meiningen – Hildburghausen – Sonneberg is an electoral constituency (German: Wahlkreis) represented in the Bundestag. It elects one member via first-past-the-post voting. Under the current constituency numbering system, it is designated as constituency 196. It is located in southwestern Thuringia, comprising the city of Suhl and the districts of Hildburghausen, Schmalkalden-Meiningen, and Sonneberg.

Suhl – Schmalkalden-Meiningen – Hildburghausen – Sonneberg was created for the inaugural 1990 federal election after German reunification. Since 2021, it has been represented by Frank Ullrich of the Social Democratic Party (SPD).

Geography
Suhl – Schmalkalden-Meiningen – Hildburghausen – Sonneberg is located in southwestern Thuringia. As of the 2021 federal election, it comprises the independent city of Suhl and the districts of Hildburghausen, Schmalkalden-Meiningen, and Sonneberg.

History
Suhl – Schmalkalden-Meiningen – Hildburghausen – Sonneberg was created after German reunification in 1990, then known as Suhl – Schmalkalden – Ilmenau – Neuhaus. In the 2002 through 2013 elections, it was named Suhl – Schmalkalden-Meiningen – Hildburghausen. It acquired its current name in the 2017 election. In the 1990 through 1998 elections, it was constituency 307 in the numbering system. In the 2002 election, it was number 199. In the 2005 election, it was number 198. In the 2009 and 2013 elections, it was number 197. Since the 2017 election, it has been number 196.

Originally, the constituency comprised the city of Suhl and the districts of Landkreis Suhl, Schmalkalden, Ilmenau, and Neuhaus. From 2002 through 2013, it comprised the city of Suhl and the districts of Schmalkalden-Meiningen and Hildburghausen. It acquired its current borders in the 2017 election.

Members
The constituency was first represented by Claudia Nolte of the Christian Democratic Union (CDU) from 1990 to 1998. Iris Gleicke of the Social Democratic Party (SPD) was representative from 1998 to 2009. Jens Petermann of The Left was elected in 2009 and served a single term. Mark Hauptmann of the CDU was elected in 2013 and re-elected in 2017. Frank Ullrich won the constituency for the SPD in 2021.

Election results

2021 election

2017 election

2013 election

2009 election

References

Federal electoral districts in Thuringia
1990 establishments in Germany
Constituencies established in 1990
Suhl
Schmalkalden-Meiningen
Hildburghausen (district)
Sonneberg (district)